The North Carolina Tar Heels football team, representing the University of North Carolina at Chapel Hill, has had 224 American football players drafted into the National Football League (NFL) since the league began holding drafts in 1936. The highest that a Tar Heel has ever been drafted is second overall, which has happened on four occasions: Ken Willard in 1965, Lawrence Taylor in 1981, Julius Peppers in 2002, and Mitch Trubisky in 2017 The Buffalo Bills and Washington Redskins have drafted the most Tar Heels with sixteen and fifteen, respectively. Every current NFL franchise has drafted a player from North Carolina.

Each NFL franchise seeks to add new players through the annual NFL Draft. The draft rules were last updated in 2009. The team with the worst record the previous year picks first, the next-worst team second, and so on. Teams that did not make the playoffs are ordered by their regular-season record, with any remaining ties broken by strength of schedule. Playoff participants are sequenced after non-playoff teams, based on their round of elimination (wild card, division, conference, and Super Bowl).

Before the merger agreements in 1966, the American Football League (AFL) operated in direct competition with the NFL and held a separate draft. This led to a massive bidding war over top prospects between the two leagues, along with the subsequent drafting of the same player in each draft. As part of the merger agreement on June 8, 1966, the two leagues held a multiple round "Common Draft". Once the AFL officially merged with the NFL in 1970, the "Common Draft" simply became the NFL Draft.

Twenty-four Tar Heels have been drafted in the first round of the NFL Draft, with the most recent being Mitch Trubisky in 2017. The single first round of the NFL Draft with the most Tar Heels selected was 1998 with three: Greg Ellis, Brian Simmons, and Vonnie Holliday. Of the Tar Heels selected in the NFL Draft, fifteen have been selected to a Pro Bowl, seventeen have been a member of a Super Bowl winning team; four have achieved both. The most Tar Heels selected in a single NFL Draft is nine, in 2011. Both Chris Hanburger and Taylor are in the Pro Football Hall of Fame.

Key

Players selected

Notes

References

General

 

Specific

North Carolina
North Carolina Tar Heels NFL Draft